{{Taxobox
| name = Strobopagurus
| image = 
| image_caption = 
| regnum = Animalia
| phylum = Arthropoda
| classis = Malacostraca
| ordo = Decapoda
| familia = Parapaguridae
| genus = Strobopagurus
| genus_authority = Lemaitre, 1989
| fossil_range = 
| subphylum = Crustacea
| infraordo = Anomura
| superfamilia = Paguroidea
| subdivision_ranks = Species
| subdivision = *Strobopagurus breviacus (Lemaitre, 2004)Strobopagurus gracilipes (A. Milne-Edwards, 1891)
Strobopagurus sibogae (de Saint Laurent, 1972)
}}Strobopagurus'' is a genus of hermit crabs in the family Parapaguridae which contains three species. The species within this genus live in oceans at depths from 5.5 to 965 meters.

References 

Hermit crabs